Pius Schwizer (born 13 August 1962) is a Swiss Olympic-level equestrian who competes in the sport of show jumping.

He won the bronze medal at the 2008 Summer Olympics in team jumping following the disqualification of Norwegian rider Tony André Hansen.

In 2012 he competed at his second Olympics.

Horses 
current:
 Jamaica VIII (born 1997), Selle Français, Mare, Father: Socrate de Chivre, Mother's Father: Kapoc, Owner: Pius Schwizer
 Ulysse (born 1997), Belgian Warmblood, Gelding, Father: Nonstop, Mother's Father: Jus de Pomme
 Nobless M (born 1998), Holsteiner horse, Mare, Father: Calido I, Mother's Father: Landgraf I, Owner: Pius Schwizer
 Carlina (born 2001), Holsteiner horse, Mare, Father: Carvallo, Mother's Father: Landgraf I
 Calidus van het Asbornveld (born 2002), Belgian Warmblood, Gelding, Father: Kannan, Mother's Father: Feinschnitt I

former show horses:
 Unique X CH (born 1996), Gelding, Father: Ulysse de Thurin, Mother's Father: Urymate de Sainte-Hermelle
 Koby du Vartellier (born 1998), Selle Français, Gelding, Father: Espoir Breceen, Mother's Father: Hidalgo de Riou
 Loving Dancer (born 1999), Holsteiner horse, Gelding, Father: La Zarras, Mother's Father: Calypso

Successes 
 Olympic Games:
 2008: with Nobless M - Rank 3 (Team) + Rank 28. (Individual)
 European Championships: 
 2007, Mannheim: with Nobless M - Rank 4 (Team) + Rank 22 (Individual)
 2009, Windsor: with Ulysee - Rank 1 (Team) + Rank 35 (Individual)
 World Cup Final: 
 2012, 's-Hertogenbosch: Rank 3 with Ulysse and Carlina

References

External links
Official website 

1962 births
Equestrians at the 2008 Summer Olympics
Equestrians at the 2012 Summer Olympics
Living people
Olympic bronze medalists for Switzerland
Olympic equestrians of Switzerland
Sportspeople from the canton of Solothurn
Swiss show jumping riders
Swiss male equestrians
Olympic medalists in equestrian
Medalists at the 2008 Summer Olympics
Horse trader